Ahmad Rasheed Miller (born April 10, 1978) is a former American football defensive tackle. He was chosen with the final pick in the 2002 NFL Draft, giving him the nickname Mr. Irrelevant. After being drafted by the Houston Texans, he went through training camp but was cut prior to their final preseason game. He then signed on to the New York Giants. Injured in second preseason game against Carolina Panthers before reaching an injury settlement with team.

References

1978 births
Living people
Players of American football from Florida
Sportspeople from Bradenton, Florida
American football defensive tackles
UNLV Rebels football players